The Neuri or Navari were a tribe described by Herodotus in the .

Primary sources

Herodotus's account 

According to Herodotus, the Neuri (Νευροί) were the furthest tribe beyond the Scythian farmers along the course of the river Hypanis. The river Tyras was the boundary between the Scythian and the Neuri, who followed Scythian customs. One generation before Darius I's campaign to Scythia (512 BC), the Neuri were driven from their land by an invasion of snakes, which forced them to live among the Budini.

Herodotus also recounts the tale that, once a year, each of the Neuri became a wolf for a few days before returning to their previous form. Herodotus "himself does not believe the tale, but he says that those who tell the tale swears that it is true". This tale was later also mentioned by Pomponius Mela.

Historical views

Olof von Dalin 
The 18th century Swedish historian Olof von Dalin wrote that the Neuri were a mixture of races: Scythians, Greeks and Levantines who accompanied the Budini or "Shepherd Scythians", to the Swedish islands around 400 BC. This exodus was the result of pressure from the Macedonians.

 the Neuri seem to be remnants of the Ten Tribes of Israel which Shalmaneser, king of Assyria, brought as captives out of Canaan... [When one realises that] the language of the ancient Finns, Lapps and Estonians is similar to the Hebrew and even that this people in ancient times reckoned their year's beginning from the first of March, and Saturday as their Sabbath, then one sees that the Neuri in all probability had this origin.

Dalin's theory is regarded as quaint by modern scholars of linguistics, who can find no connections between the Semitic languages and the Neuri.

Contemporary scholarship 

More and more scholars come to the conclusion that Neuri were a branch of Western Baltic people (specifically the Yotvingians who lived around the river Narew or as they called it "Naura" which gave the name Neuri) and best coincides with the spread of Jukhnovo culture or Plain Pottery group.
Latvian linguist Pēteris Šmits also associates Neuri with Balts.

According to some scholars, the invasion of snakes mentioned by Herodotus can be interpreted as a description of Baltic expansion, as the worship of the grass snake is an important part of Baltic mythology.

References

Sources

External links 
 Marija Gimbutas, The Balts, p. 97-102

Ancient peoples
Tribes described primarily by Herodotus
Ancient history of Belarus
Scythia